A Mirror for Witches is a 1928 novel by American author Esther Forbes, dealing with the witch hunt in 17th Century New England.  The book, which precedes by decades the more famous The Crucible by Arthur Miller, is still popular and remains in print. It pretends to be an authentic seventeenth century chronicle of a witch's life, based on contemporary sources.

The book has also been adapted for the stage, including as a ballet by Denis ApIvor (1952) and as an opera, Bilby's Doll by Carlisle Floyd (1976).

Synopsis 
Doll Bilby is a young girl, denounced by a relative as being a witch, and is then caught up in the hysteria of the Salem witch trials.

See also
 
 Cultural depictions of the Salem Witch Trials

References

1928 American novels
American historical novels
Salem witch trials in fiction
Novels set in Massachusetts
Novels set in the American colonial era
Novels set in the 17th century
Fiction set in the 1690s
Novels adapted into operas